Epping Road is an arterial road through the northern fringes of Melbourne, linking the outer northern suburb of  to the outer northern fringe at .

Major intersections

|}

References

External links 

Roads in Victoria (Australia)
Streets in Melbourne
Transport in the City of Whittlesea